Shah Wali Ullah Nagar  is a neighborhood in Orangi Town in Karachi, Sindh, Pakistan.

There are several ethnic groups including Muhajirs, Sindhis, Kashmiris, Punjabis, Pakhtuns, Balochis, Memons, Bohras and Ismailis.

This neighbourhood is named in the honour of Qutb-ud-Dīn Ahmad ibn 'Abdul Rahīm, also known as Shāh Walīullāh and Shāh WalĪ Allāh (1703–1762 CE / 1114–1176 AH) was an Islamic scholar, reformer and founder of modern Islamic thought who attempted to reassess Islamic theology in the light of modern changes.

References

External links 
 Karachi Website

Neighbourhoods of Karachi
Orangi Town